La Leyenda del Dembow Tour is the first world tour by Dominican dembow superstar El Alfa to promote his studio album El Androide (2020) and Sabiduria (2022). The tour consisted on three legs. The first leg, was his the first arena tour on the United States, the second on a series of music festivals on Europe and concluded in Santo Domingo, Dominican Republic. The tour included a sellout concert in New York, Madison Square Garden which receive positive reviews by critcs becoming the first Dominican urban act to do so. On July 16, El Alfa performed at Estadio Olimpico in Santo Domingo, in front of 50,000 fans, becoming just the seventh Dominican act to sold out the venue and the first urban act to do so.

Tour dates

Notes

Cancelled Concerts

References 

Dominica music
2021 concert tours
2022 concert tours